Susan B. Anthony House, in Rochester, New York, was the home of Susan B. Anthony for forty years, while she was a national figure in the women's rights movement.

She was arrested in the front parlor after voting in the 1872 Presidential Election.  She resided here until her death.

The house was purchased for use as a memorial in 1945, and declared a National Historic Landmark in 1965. It has been documented in the Historic American Buildings Survey.

The Susan B. Anthony House is located at 17 Madison Street in Rochester. Access to the house is through the Susan B. Anthony Museum entrance at 19 Madison Street.

Today the Susan B. Anthony House is a learning center and museum open to the public for tours and programs from 11-5 Tuesday through Sunday, except major holidays.  Its full name is the National Susan B. Anthony Museum & House. The Visitor Center and Museum Shop are located in the historic house next door, 19 Madison Street, which was owned by Hannah Anthony Mosher, sister of Susan and Mary Anthony. The mission of the Susan B. Anthony House is to keep Susan B. Anthony's vision alive and relevant.

The house hosts an annual celebration of Nineteenth Amendment to the United States Constitution, which gave women the right to vote. In 2011, the New York Times reported that the museum at the house had sold a large quantity of "a $250 handbag made of fake alligator that was inspired by one of Anthony’s own club bags, similar to a doctor’s bag," noting that for Anthony, "a bag was not a fashion statement but a symbol of independence at a time when women were not allowed to enter into a contract or even open a bank account."

Papers and memorabilia about the suffrage movement were donated to the house at the request of Carrie Chapman Catt, Susan B. Anthony's successor as President of the National American Woman Suffrage Association. They are held by the River Campus Libraries of the University of Rochester.

The House's president wrote to "decline" President Donald Trump's August 2020 pardon to Anthony, on the principle that to accept a pardon would wrongly "validate" the trial proceedings in the same manner that paying the $100 fine would have.

A fire early on the morning of September 26, 2021 damaged the back porch and a doorway and caused smoke damage inside. Surveillance video showed someone acting suspiciously at the time of the fire.

References

External links

 National Susan B. Anthony Museum House on Google Cultural Institute

Houses on the National Register of Historic Places in New York (state)
Houses in Rochester, New York
National Historic Landmarks in New York (state)
Historic house museums in New York (state)
Women's museums in the United States
Houses completed in 1866
Museums in Rochester, New York
Biographical museums in New York (state)
Susan B. Anthony
Historic American Buildings Survey in New York (state)
1866 establishments in New York (state)
National Register of Historic Places in Rochester, New York